Superband may mean or refer to:
 Supergroup (music), a term describing a rock music group whose performers are already notable from having performed individually or in other groups
 Superband (band), a Mandopop band from Taiwan
 Superband (TV program), a 2019 Korean music competition show on JTBC
 SuperBand, a TV spinoff of a popular singing talent-search competition in Singapore from 2006–2008
 Cable television frequency band (Europe, North America)